Ramón Artigas (1 March 1908 – 4 January 1995) was a Spanish swimmer. He competed in the men's 4 × 200 metre freestyle relay event at the 1928 Summer Olympics.

References

External links
 

1908 births
1995 deaths
Olympic swimmers of Spain
Swimmers at the 1928 Summer Olympics
Swimmers from Barcelona
Spanish male freestyle swimmers